The Ramses Station rail disaster occurred on 27 February 2019 in Ramses Station of Cairo, Egypt. Twenty-five people were killed and forty injured.

Accident
In the early morning of 27 February 2019, in Cairo's main train station, Ramses Station, a locomotive hit the buffers at the end of the track at platform 6 at high speed, causing an explosion that sparked a major blaze and fireball that blackened the walls of the station. The locomotive could later be seen inside, leaning to one side next to a platform. One eyewitness said:

It was later confirmed that the driver was not inside the locomotive during the accident. According to Egypt's Prosecutor General, Nabil Sadek, one train driver had left his train to fight with another train driver; thereafter, the unmanned train struck the barrier.

Transport Minister Hisham Arafat resigned after the incident.

An Egyptian member of parliament publicly called for the employees that were responsible for the accident to face the death penalty.

See also
Alexandria train collision

References

2019 disasters in Egypt
2019 fires in Africa
2019 in Egypt
2010s in Cairo
Derailments in Egypt
February 2019 events in Egypt
Fires in Egypt
Railway accidents and incidents in Egypt
Railway accidents in 2019
Urban fires